MV Halfaya has been the name of a number of ships.
MV Halfaya, launched in 1945 as Empire Seabank.
MV Halfaya, launched in 1945 as Empire Seaforth.

Ship names